Ripley A. Arnold (1817–1853) was a major in the United States Army and founder of Camp Worth in 1849, later renamed Fort Worth, Texas. In 2014 a 22-foot statue was dedicated to Arnold. It was erected along the Trinity River below the army camp site he established and named after one of his military commanders.

Early life
Arnold was born in Pearlington, Mississippi, on January 17, 1817, to Willis Arnold.

Army life
He was appointed to West Point in 1834 and graduated thirty-third in his class. He was sent to the Second Dragoons in Florida in 1838 and brevetted captain in 1842 for gallantry in the Seminole War and major in 1846 for his role in the battle of Palo Alto. After the Mexican–American War, he was given command of Company F of the Second Dragoons and sent to Texas to establish a military post close to the Trinity River. After locating a suitable site, Arnold left Fort Graham with 42 dragoons to establish Camp Worth, named after his former commanding officer, who had recently died of cholera in San Antonio. It was completed by the winter of 1849 and later renamed Fort Worth.

Personal life
He eloped with Catherine Bryant on August 26, 1839.

Death
Ripley Arnold was killed by Josephus Steiner in a duel at Fort Graham, Texas, where Arnold was the commanding officer and Steiner the physician. He was buried at Fort Graham, and was reinterred and reburied in Fort Worth at Pioneers Rest Cemetery.

References 

American military personnel of the Mexican–American War
American military personnel of the Indian Wars
Military personnel from Mississippi
Military personnel from Texas
1817 births
1853 deaths
People from Hancock County, Mississippi
Burials at Pioneers Rest (Fort Worth, Texas)